La ragazza dal pigiama giallo (Italian for The Girl in the Yellow Pyjama) is a soundtrack album for Italian movie of the same name, released in 1978 by Italian label Cinevox. The album includes the instrumental score by composer Riz Ortolani as well as two songs with vocals by Amanda Lear, recorded at studio Trafalgar in Rome, Italy. The album remains unreleased on compact disc.

Track listing 
Side A:
 "La ragazza dal pigiama giallo" (Riz Ortolani) – 3:53
 "Un uomo nella strada" (Riz Ortolani) – 4:05
 "Look at Her Dancing" (Riz Ortolani, Amanda Lear) – 4:14
 "La fuga" (Riz Ortolani) – 3:55

Side B:
 "Your Yellow Pyjama" (Riz Ortolani, Amanda Lear) – 4:17
 "Incontro sul battello" (Riz Ortolani) – 3:44
 "Il corpo di Linda" (Riz Ortolani) – 3:48
 "Un uomo nella strada" (Titoli finali) (Riz Ortolani) – 4:04

Credits 
 Giorgio Agazzi – sound engineer
 Amanda Lear – lead vocals (tracks A3 and B1)
 Riz Ortolani – composer, arranger

References

External links 
 La ragazza dal pigiama giallo on Discogs
 La ragazza dal pigiama giallo on Rate Your Music

1978 soundtrack albums
Film soundtracks